The Vossloh G6 is a C diesel-hydraulic shunting locomotive, and the first locomotive of Vossloh's fifth generation programme. The G6 is the successor of the MaK/Vossloh G765, a third-generation MaK locomotive still offered in the 2000s.

At Innotrans 2012, a twin 350 kW diesel-engined version with electrical transmission was shown, with additional variants proposed including single-engined, hybrid, and battery-powered version.

History
The first locomotive of the class was shown on InnoTrans 2008. Verkehrsbetriebe Peine-Salzgitter (VPS) was the launch customer and ordered 18 locomotives in April 2010, the contract was valued at approximately €25 million; the locomotives were ordered as part of a replacement program for VPS's fleet of 43 three axle diesels. The first locomotive for VPS was exhibited at InnoTrans 2010, along with the other new members of the 5th generation family.

In 2012, at Innotrans Vossloh displayed a multiengined diesel-electric version, the G6 ME; the design uses two 350 kW truck engines, meeting Euro 97/68 IIIB emission standards (Euro stage V) with other main specifications unchanged, utilising the same underframe, cab, brakes and controls of the diesel hydraulic version. Other potential variants of the electric transmission design included a single engined version (350 or 700 kW), and hybrid (350 kW plus electric energy storage) and a non-diesel version G6 Akku with electric battery and electrical energy storage devices.

A second major order for 16 G6 (and 4 DE12 and 2 DE18) locomotives was placed by BASF in Dec 2011. In early 2014 the first locomotive to be fitted with the new design MTU R 1600 R50 engine was put in service at BASF Ludwigshafen.

Certification for use on the French railnetwork was obtained in 2014.

Orders and leases

See also
Voith Gravita, of which the 5C variant is a direct competitor to the G6.

References

Sources

External links

G6
Railway locomotives introduced in 2008
C locomotives
Standard gauge locomotives of Germany
Standard gauge locomotives of Poland
Diesel-hydraulic locomotives of Germany